, also known as Hiko Isuseri-hiko no mikoto, was a legendary Japanese prince.  

According to the Nihon Shoki, he was the son of Emperor Kōrei. Legend says this prince slayed an ogre called Ura, which may be the demonization of the Kingdom of Kibi, destroyed during the reign of Kōrei-Tennō. 

His kami is enshrined at Shinto shrines in Okayama Prefecture and Hiroshima Prefecture.

References

People of Yayoi-period Japan
Year of birth unknown
Year of death unknown
Sons of emperors